Dorateuthis is a genus of cephalopod with a gladius and soft-part anatomy preserved.  Fossils of D. syriaca are found in Upper Santonian-aged shale of Late Cretaceous Lebanon.

References

External links
Image: 

Prehistoric cephalopod genera
Cretaceous cephalopods